Thauera terpenica is a gram-negative mesophilic motile bacterium from the genus of Thauera.

References

External links 	
 Type strain of Thauera terpenica at BacDive -  the Bacterial Diversity Metadatabase

Rhodocyclaceae
Bacteria described in 1999